The  logothetēs tōn agelōn, in English the Logothete of the Herds, was the Byzantine official responsible for the state-run estates (mētata) in western Asia Minor that reared horses and mules for the Byzantine army and the imperial Public Post.

History and functions
The Byzantine office appears in the 9th century and is commonly accepted to be the evolution of the 4th-century Roman praepositus gregum et stabulorum, who was subordinate to the comes res privatae. Uniquely among the logothetes, the logothetēs tōn agelōn is listed among the high military officials (stratarchai) in the 899 Klētotologion of Philotheos, 40th in the hierarchy from the emperor, highlighting the office's close connection with the army. The importance of the office increased from the 10th century, reaching its zenith in the late 13th century, when it was held by several of the most important state officials.

Subordinate officials
The subordinates of the logothetēs tōn agelōn were:

The prōtonotarioi for Asia and Phrygia, where the mētata were apparently concentrated.
The dioikētai of the mētata, the administrators of the horse farms and successors to the Roman procuratores saltuum.
The episkeptētai ("inspectors") and komētes ("counts"), the latter of unclear function.

Sigillographic evidence also attests to the existence of chartoularioi and of an ek prosōpou ("representative") of the department.

List of known logothetai tōn agelōn

References

Sources

 
 
 
 
 

Byzantine administrative offices
Byzantine military offices
Agelon